Worship and Tribute is the second studio album by American post-hardcore band Glassjaw. It is the band's only studio album with Warner Bros. Records after an unpleasant split with Roadrunner Records. It was released on July 9, 2002. As with their first full-length album, Worship and Tribute was produced by Ross Robinson and mixed and engineered by Mike Fraser. It peaked at #82 on the Billboard 200 on July 27, 2002, remaining on the chart for three weeks. It is recognized as one of the greatest post-hardcore albums and one of the greatest albums of the 2000s.

Production and style
Vocalist Daryl Palumbo has stated that while Glassjaw's debut album was filled with negativity, Worship and Tribute is much more optimistic in tone. Regarding the album title, Palumbo expressed how the bands that influenced Glassjaw have shaped their musical identity and are therefore being honored through Glassjaw's music:
"You are only a sum of all of your influences and that's what we are. . . I think that we're original and I think that what we're doing is different and that's something I always knew we had on our side, but no matter how original you are you're still just a sum of your influences."

Guitarist Todd Weinstock has regarded continuity as the biggest difference between Glassjaw's debut album and Worship and Tribute, noting "EYEWTKAS was just kind a bunch of songs written over years and when we got signed we were like 'okay we got some songs we can throw together.' With Worship we went into it with the intentions of writing an album that made sense as a unit as opposed to a bunch of songs, some of which may have even been written four years earlier!" He also noted that, due to the fact that the album was written around the time of the September 11 attacks, its tone was affected by the tragedy.

Originally, Worship and Tribute was to have twelve songs with the last song entitled "Convectuoso." The band, however, had recorded the song with their previous label, Roadrunner Records, for the "Ry Ry's Song" single. Since Glassjaw abruptly ended their contract to sign with Warner Bros., Roadrunner retained the rights to that song and refused to let the newly rerecorded "Convectuoso" be released on the final album despite being on promotional copies. The vinyl release of Worship and Tribute featured in the band's 20+ Year Anniversary Collection, released in 2022, features the re-recording, as was initially intended.

Promotion and touring
Dave Allen joined Glassjaw as bassist following the recording of Worship and Tribute. The band then toured extensively, including festival tours such as Warped Tour, Ozzfest and SnoCore, and an appearance at Skate and Surf Fest. In April and May 2002, the band toured with Converge, Reach the Sky, and Stalemate. They embarked on a co-headlining US tour with Poison the Well in May 2002; both acts were supported by Vex Red and Recover. In June, the band went on a brief tour of the east coast with the Juliana Theory and Piebald. Following this, Glassjaw toured as part of Warped Tour and Ozzfest between July and September 2002. "Cosmopolitan Bloodloss" was released to Active rock radio on September 27, 2002.

Daryl Palumbo's Crohn's disease brought heavy burden onto Glassjaw's touring schedule in promotion of Worship and Tribute. On October 1, 2002, he was rushed to a Paris hospital and Glassjaw's European tour schedule was postponed for December. In October and November, the band went on a headlining US tour with American Nightmare, the Blood Brothers, and Open Hand. On December 5, as Glassjaw returned from a US flight, Palumbo relapsed and was again rushed to a London hospital and forced the cancellation of the rescheduled dates. Later in December, the band appeared at Gainesvillefest. In February and March, the band toured across the US with Hot Water Music and Sparta as part of the 2003 Sno-Core Tour. "Ape Dos Mil" was released to Modern rock radio on February 11, 2003; the song's music video was posted online five days later. The European dates were rescheduled for a second time in April 2003. From June to August, the group went on the 2003 edition of Warped Tour.

The band were due to perform the album in full at the Sonisphere Festival at Knebworth on the 10th anniversary of the album's release, but the event was cancelled.

Packaging
The original 2002 CD release of the album did not include a front insert, but rather a clear film sheet that had a picture of a record player arm. The disc itself was designed to look like a vinyl record, and the inside tray included a picture of a record player. The overall product is supposed to look like a vinyl record being played on a record player. The album was reissued for the first time on vinyl format in 2011 for Record Store Day. The record was packaged in a clear plastic sleeve with a picture of a record player arm printed on the front of the sleeve. It also included a sheet with the picture of the record player printed on it. This first pressing is known for its PVC sleeve which caused a chemical reaction and damaged the record within it. The vinyl version was reissued again in 2014, with 1,000 copies pressed on clear vinyl.

Critical reception

Allmusic's William Ruhlmann gave Worship and Tribute a positive review, noting "Cosmopolitan Bloodloss" an AMG Track Pick. He described Glassjaw as "more interesting than their metal peers" and reflected "Glassjaw can pound it out like the best of them, but the fun comes in never knowing what variation the band will throw in next." Billboard called the album "innovative." Pitchfork referred to the album as a "genre-defining work."

NME declared Worship and Tribute to be "the greatest ‘underground breakthrough’ album since Deftones." The Long Island Press called it "the album that helped rethink, reshape, and expand the boundaries of the genre". Mehan Jayasuriya of PopMatters noted "Worship and Tribute addressed many of these lyrical flaws [of Glassjaw's debut album] and introduced a wider palette of sounds to the band’s arsenal; in so doing, however, it lost sight of much of the momentum and focus that made the band notable in the first place." Adrien Begrand, also of PopMatters, gave an in-depth review where he acknowledged the band's talent in select songs but also stressed the poor quality of Worship and Tribute as a whole: "They've shown they're a smart band, both musically and lyrically, but on Worship and Tribute, listeners are stuck with 40 percent inspiration, 60 percent filler." Kludge included it on their list of best albums of 2002.

The January 2008 issue of Alternative Press (AP #234) included Worship and Tribute on its "10 Essential Albums We’re Waiting For Follow Ups to." The issue also hyped the oncoming Head Automatica album. NME listed the album as one of "20 Emo Albums That Have Resolutely Stood The Test Of Time". Sputnikmusic listed the album at No. 15 in their list of the Top 100 Albums of the 2000s. Paste listed the album at No. 7 in their list of the 25 Greatest Punk Albums of the 2000s. Alternative Press ranked "Ape Dos Mil" at number 60 on their list of the best 100 singles from the 2000s.

Awards
Nominated for a Best Recording Package Grammy in 2003.
In 2007, Kerrang! named Worship and Tribute an "album you must own."

Track listing
All music written by Glassjaw; all lyrics written by Daryl Palumbo.

 "Two Tabs of Mescaline" ends at 6:12. After 1 minute and 30 seconds of silence, at 7:42, an untitled hidden track begins. The hidden track is kept on track 11, even on the Japanese version where the bonus track, "El Mark", follows. However, on the advance CD, "Two Tabs of Mescaline" is only 6:12, while the hidden track is placed at the end of "Convectuoso" (5:45).

B-Sides
There are 7 B-sides from Worship and Tribute:

 "Convectuoso" ends at 5:45. The hidden track follows it, beginning at 7:15.
 The song "Neo Tokyon" was recorded for the album. The band played it live before the album came out and it hadn't been heard since. While the band did some 2016 touring, it made its way back into their setlist as "Neo" before finally being released under the name "Citizen" on their 2017 album Material Control.

Personnel
Personnel per booklet.

Glassjaw
 Daryl Palumbo – vocals
 Justin Beck – guitar, bass
 Todd Weinstock – guitar
 Shannon Larkin – drums
 Larry Gorman – backing vocals

Production and design
 Ross Robinson – producer
 Mike Fraser – mixing (all except track 3)
 Chris Lord-Alge – mixing (track 3)

Appearances
 The song "Cosmopolitan Bloodloss" was featured in the video game Legends of Wrestling II in 2002.

References
Citations

Sources

 

Glassjaw albums
2002 albums
Albums produced by Ross Robinson
Warner Records albums
Punk rock albums by American artists
Emo albums by American artists